Bugongi is a town in the Western Region of Uganda. It is an urban center in Sheema District.

Location
The coordinates of the town are: 0°38'08.0"S, 30°15'10.0"E (Latitude:-0.635556; Longitude:30.252778).

Overview
Bugongi Town Council measures  or (9,000 acres). Uganda's president, Yoweri Museveni, has on more than one occasion, promised to tarmac the road that passes through Bugongi and serves as its main street.

Population
, the national census and household survey, enumerated the total population of Bugongi Town Council to be 11,547 people, of whom 5,995 (51.9%) were female and 5,552 (48.1%) were male. At that time, the population density in the town was 318/km2 (820/sq mi).

Health
Bugongi Health Center III is the main public healthcare facility in the town. However, due to the dilapidated nature of the infrastructure, the services offered are below standards and many in the community seek services elsewhere.

Finance
Bugongi is home to Bugongi Savings and Community Cooperative Organization (Bugongi SACCO), a farmers community cooperative. As of June 2010, Bugongi SACCO had 2,257 members, with USh330 million in share capital (US$132,000), USh220 million (US$88,000) in savings and a loan portfolio of USh626 million (US$250,400).
Note: In June 2010, US$1.00 = USh2,500

See also
 Sheema Municipality
 List of roads in Uganda

References

External links
 Sheema Christians Take Diocese Fight To Schools As of 26 August 2015.

 

Populated places in Western Region, Uganda
Cities in the Great Rift Valley
Sheema District